The Pacific koel (Eudynamys orientalis), also known as the eastern koel or formerly common koel, is a species of cuckoo in the family Cuculidae. In Australia, it is colloquially known as the rainbird or stormbird, as its call is usually more prevalent before or during stormy weather.

Taxonomy
It has often been considered conspecific with the Asian and black-billed koels, but they are increasingly treated as a separate species. Alternatively, the population breeding in Australia has been considered a separate species, the Australian Koel (Eudynamys cyanocephalus), with the remaining taxa then considered subspecies of the Asian koel.

Distribution and habitat
The Pacific koel is found in forest, woodland, plantations and gardens from Wallacea east to the Solomon Islands and south to northern and eastern Australia. The Pacific koel has not been rated by IUCN, but the Australian Koel (here included in the Pacific koel) is considered to be of Least Concern.

Behaviour

The Pacific koel is a brood parasite. In Australia, their hosts are mainly large honeyeaters (especially noisy friarbirds and red wattlebirds). Unlike in other parasitic cuckoos, the young do not attempt to kill the host chicks. This trait is shared with the channel-billed cuckoo, which – as in the Pacific koel – are largely frugivorous as adults. A study of vocalization noted that the duetting behaviour may indicate the possibility of short-term pair-bonding in its otherwise polygynous mating system.

Identification

The Pacific Koel can be identified by its black plumage, often tinted with blue and green, and red eye. Like most animals the Pacific Koel is subject to Sexual dimorphism as its females sport brown plumage along their back with white spots and their underbellies are often cream coloured with fine black stripes. While young birds resemble the female they have dark eyes.

Gallery

References

 Payne, R. B. (1997) Eudynamys scolopacea (Common Koel). pp. 570–571 in: del Hoyo, J.; Elliot, A. & Christie, D. (editors). (1997). Handbook of the Birds of the World. Volume 4: Sandgrouse to Cuckoos. Lynx Edicions. 

Pacific koel
Birds of Sulawesi
Birds of the Maluku Islands
Birds of the Lesser Sunda Islands
Birds of New Guinea
Birds of the Solomon Islands
Birds of the Northern Territory
Birds of Queensland
Birds of New South Wales
Pacific koel
Pacific koel
Articles containing video clips